Metisella malgacha, the grassveld sylph, is a butterfly of the family Hesperiidae. It is found in the Cape, Free State, Lesotho, Transvaal, and KwaZulu-Natal in South Africa. The habitat consists of grassland and grassy areas in the fynbos and Karoo.

The wingspan is 25–29 mm for males and 27–31 mm for females.

Flight period is between August and May with several broods possible or December to January at highest elevations.

The upperside wings have many gold spots on a brown background similar to the gold spotted sylph (M. aegipan) that has a darker background. The spots on M. malgacha are typically smaller than M. aegipan. The underside of the wings are orange brown. Sexes are similar.

The larvae feed on Ehrharta erecta.

Subspecies
Metisella malgacha malgacha (South Africa: Mpumalanga, North West Province, Gauteng, Free State Province, KwaZulu-Natal, Eastern Cape Province, Western Cape Province, Northern Cape Province)
Metisella malgacha orina Vári, 1976 (Lesotho, South Africa: Mpumalanga, KwaZulu-Natal – Drakensberg)

References

Butterflies described in 1833
Heteropterinae